The population of Gujarat was 60,439,692 (31,491,260 males and 28,948,432 females) according to the 2011 census data. The population density is 308 persons per square kilometer (797.6/sq mi), lower than other Indian states. As per the census of 2011, the state has a sex ratio of 918 females for every 1000 males, one of the lowest (ranked 24) among the 29 states in India.

Demographics

List of Regional Transport Office districts in Gujarat 

GJ—Gujarat

Distribution of population 
The following table shows the distributions of male and female populations of Gujarat's districts, as of 2011:

By District:

List of districts in Gujarat by Human Development Index

List of developmental administrative units of Gujarat

List of revenue divisions of Gujarat

List of constituencies of the Lok Sabha in Gujarat

See also 
 Economy of Gujarat

References 

Gujarat
Economy of Gujarat